Arantza Gumucio (born 4 October 1989) is a Chilean competitive sailor. She competed at the 2016 Summer Olympics in Rio de Janeiro, in the women's 49erFX.

References

1989 births
Living people
Chilean female sailors (sport)
Olympic sailors of Chile
Sailors at the 2016 Summer Olympics – 49er FX
21st-century Chilean women